Riggins may refer to:

Riggins, Idaho
Riggins, Mississippi
Riggins (surname)